Ernesto Gómez Cruz (born 7 November 1933) is a Mexican prolific actor with more than 154 films.

He has been nominated several times for the Ariel Award. These include his acting in El infierno (2010), El crimen del padre Amaro (2002), El imperio de la fortuna by Arturo Ripstein (1987), La Víspera (1983), Cadena perpetua by Ripstein (1979), La venida del Rey Olmos by Julián Pastor (1975), and Rosa by José Estrada (1969).

Selected filmography
 Reed: Insurgent Mexico (1973)
 Roots of Blood (1978)
 The Recourse to the Method (1978)
 Guerrilla from the North (1983)
 The Realm of Fortune (1986)
 Life Is Most Important (1987)
 Sandino (1990)
 Midaq Alley (1995)

References

External links
 .
Mexican Academy of Cinematographic Arts and Sciences profile .

1933 births
Best Actor Ariel Award winners
Living people
Mexican male film actors
Male actors from Veracruz
People from Veracruz (city)